Marty Smyth is a professional poker player from Belfast, Northern Ireland with a track record including wins in the 2007 Irish Poker Open Championship and the 2008 Poker Million. He won his first WSOP bracelet in the 2008 $10,000 Pot Limit Omaha World Championship.

Poker career
Marty Smyth has played poker since his early teens. He first discovered Omaha and Texas hold'em on a weekend trip to a Dublin casino at the age of 22. He continued to play regularly, eventually becoming a successful professional player. In March 2008 Smyth signed a sponsorship deal with Irish-based company, Boylepoker.com. Marty was the highest earning European player in 2007 and has since been nominated for two European Poker Awards, Player of the Year 2008 and Best Tournament Performance 2008.

Irish Poker Open
Smyth has placed in the Irish Poker Open, Europe's oldest and largest poker tournament, on four occasions. He placed 7th in 2002 and 6th in 2003. In the 2006 event, Smyth placed 15th. He defeated the largest field ever assembled for a European poker tournament when in 2007, he won the €3,300 buy-in event in Dublin. 708 players began the four-day event playing down to the final table. Smyth eventually defeated Roland De Wolfe in a heads-up encounter  Terry Rogers Memorial Trophy and earning €650,000. The event was televised in Ireland on RTÉ Two and internationally on Challenge.

Poker Million
Smyth competed in the Ladbrokes sponsored Poker Million V event in England in 2006.
He placed 6th on the final table, winning $100,000 in prize money. The event was broadcast on Sky Sports. He also made the final table the following year, finishing 2nd to Joe Beevers for $500,000. In 2008, Smyth reached a record-breaking third consecutive final of the event, winning the $1,000,000 first prize.

World Series of Poker
Smyth won the $10,000 Pot-Limit Omaha World Championship on 2 July 2008 winning $859,532. Marty considers his bracelet win to be his biggest achievement, but highlights the Irish Open title as his most "life-changing".

World Series of Poker Bracelet

As of 2009, his total live tournament winnings exceed $3,700,000. His two cashes at the WSOP account for $863,382 of those winnings.

Notes

Poker players from Northern Ireland
Irish poker players
Living people
World Series of Poker bracelet winners
Irish Poker Open winners
Year of birth missing (living people)